Sormunen is a Finnish surname. Notable people with the surname include:

 Ilmari Sormunen (1896–1980), Finnish farmer and politician
 Pasi Sormunen (born 1970), Finnish professional ice hockey player
 Aileen Geving (born 1987), née Sormunen, American curler
 Oona Sormunen (born 1989), Finnish javelin thrower

Finnish-language surnames